The Dolomites Gold Cup Race (translation: Coppa d' Oro delle Dolomiti) was a car race on public roads open to traffic, which was run in the Dolomite Mountains of northern Italy for ten years from 1947 to 1956. It took place along an anti-clockwise circuit that was 304 km (188 miles) long and usually took about 3 to 4 hours to complete the one lap that made up the race distance, with the start and finish in the town of Cortina d'Ampezzo. The circuit went through many Italian towns, and it had nearly 2,000 meters (2 km, 1.25 miles, or 6,600 feet) of elevation change- more than 6 1/2 times that of the Nürburgring and the Isle of Man TT track.

The official name of the race has changed over the years. In 1947, it was known as the "Cup of the Dolomites", from 1948 to 1950 it was known as the "International Cup of the Dolomites", and in 1951 it was renamed the "Gold Cup of the Dolomites".

The race was not continued after 1956 after the fatal accident of Spaniard Alfonso de Portago at the 1957 Mille Miglia, which killed 9 spectators, which prompted the Italian government to temporarily ban racing on public roads.

The race was established by the Automobile Club of Belluno, which is still the runner of the now historic motorsport event, since 1972. The race is included in the FIA international calendar as "Big Event CSAI" classic regularity.

The race 
The race's official title has changed over the years.  On its foundation in 1947 it was the Coppa delle Dolomiti (Dolomites Cup); then from 1948 to 1950 it became the Coppa Internazionale delle Dolomiti (International Dolomites Cup).  From 1951 on, the title became the definitive Coppa d'Oro delle Dolomiti (Dolomites Gold Cup).

In the course of the race's history, the Gold Cup was awarded to the driver achieving the best result over three successive years.  From the three races in 1950-1952 it was awarded to Salvatore Amendola, and in the following three-year period from 1953-1955 to Giulio Cabianca.

The race was started and run like a rally, where drivers started individually at timed intervals racing against the clock, like the Mille Miglia and the Targa Florio.

Categories 
During the historical races from 1947 to 1956, automobiles were divided into categories, each of which was subdivided into classes by the engine capacity in cubic centimetres.

The trophy and its allocation
The trophy for the winner is an artistic reproduction of the kilometer milestone of SS 48 in Cortina d'Ampezzo, embedded in a block of Dolomite rocks, this makes up of peaks of these mountains.

In the historical period of the race, the Gold Cup was definitively assigned to the driver who obtained the best result by adding the times achieved in three consecutive years. In 1950-1952 Salvatore Ammendola won the Cup, in the following three years, 1953-1955, Giulio Cabianca won the prize.

Circuit route(meters/ft)
 Cortina d'Ampezzo (1210 m/3970 ft) -
 Pocol (1530 m/5020 ft) –
 Passo Falzarego (2105 m/6906 ft) –
 Andraz (1392 m/4567 ft) –
 Pieve di  Livinallongo (1465 m/4806 ft) –
 Arabba (1591 m/5219 ft) –
 Pordoi Pass (2239 m/7346 ft) –
 Sella Pass junction (1819 m/5968 ft) –
 Canazei (1467 m/4813 ft) –
 Vigo di Fassa (1342 m/4403 ft) –
 Moena (1184 m/3885 ft) –
 Predazzo (1114 m/3655 ft) –
 Rolle Pass (1970 m/6463 ft) –
 San Martino di Castrozza (1467 m/4813 ft) –
 Fiera di Primiero (713 m/2339 ft) –
 Fonzaso (329 m/1079 ft) –
 Feltre (325 m/1066 ft) –
 Belluno (389 m/1276 ft) –
 Longarone (472 m/1549 ft) –
 Pieve di Cadore (878 m/2884 ft) –
 Auronzo (864 m/2835 ft) –
 Misurina (1756 m/4761 ft) –
 Carbonin (1437 m/4715 ft) –
 Passo Cimabanche (1529 m/5016 ft) –
 Cortina d’Ampezzo (1210 m/3970 ft)

Top 3 results for each race

1947 - 20 July / The Cup of the Dolomites
 Salvatore Ammendola - Alfa Romeo 6C 2500 SS - 3h58m18s 76.492 km/h (47.529 mph)
 Piero Dusio - Cisitalia 202 MM - 4h01m45s "
 Alberto Gidoni - Fiat 1100 S Gidoni - 4h03m06s "
1948 - 11 July / II International Cup of the Dolomites
 Giovanni Bracco - Maserati A6GCS - 3h40m47s - 82.560 km/h (51.300 mph)
 Luigi Villoresi - Maserati A6GCS - 3h44m32s
 Soave Besana - Ferrari 166 SC - 3h45m57s
1949 - 17 July / III International Cup of the Dolomites
 Roberto Vallone - Ferrari 166 SC- 3h45m02s - 81.001 km/h (50.332 mph)
 Franco Cornacchia - Ferrari 166 MM - 3h48m19s
 Franco Rol - Alfa Romeo 6C 2500 Competizione - 3h48m20s
1950 - 16 July / IV International Cup of the Dolomites
 Giannino Marzotto - Ferrari 166 MM - 3h34m31s - 84.972 km/h (52.799 mph)
 Giovanni Bracco - Maserati A6GCS - 3h34m45s
 Franco Cornacchia - Ferrari 195 S - 3h41m39s
1951 - 15 July / V Gold Cup of the Dolomites
 Enrico Anselmi - Lancia Aurelia B20 - 3h45m07s -80.971 km/h (50.313 mph)
 Umberto Castiglioni - Lancia Aurelia B20 - 3h47m30s
 Giulio Cabianca - Osca MT4 1100 - 3h47m37s
1952 - 13 July / VI Gold Cup of the Dolomites
 Paolo Marzotto - Ferrari 225 S - 3h22m25s - 84.528 km/h (52.523 mph)
 Giannino Marzotto - Ferrari 340 America - 3h25m57s
 Giulio Cabianca - Osca MT4 1100 - 3h33'49
1953 - 12 July / VII Gold Cup of the Dolomites
 Paolo Marzotto - Ferrari 250 MM - 3h18m19s - 91.913 km/h (57.112 mph)
 Piero Taruffi - Lancia D23 - 3h19m52s
 Umberto Maglioli - Ferrari 735 S - 3h20m02s
1954 - 11 July / VIII Gold Cup of the Dolomites
 Sergio Mantovani - Maserati A6GCS - 3h19m36s - 91.319 km (56.743 mph)
 Giulio Cabianca - Osca MT4 1500 - 3h20m23s
 Gerino Gerini - Ferrari 250 Monza - 3h20m30s
1955 - 10 July / IX Gold Cup of the Dolomites
 Olivier Gendebien - Mercedes-Benz 300 SL - 3h23m01s - 89.779 km/h (55.786 mph)
 Eugenio Castellotti - Ferrari 500 Mondial - 3h23m22s
 Giulio Cabianca - Osca MT4 1500 - 3h27m02s
1956 - 8 July / X Gold Cup of the Dolomites
 Giulio Cabianca - Osca MT4 1500 - 3h01m31s - 100.417 km/h (62.396 mph) (lap record)
 Olivier Gendebien - Ferrari 860 Monza - 3h05m18s
 Umberto Maglioli - Osca MT4 1500 - 3h09m47s

References

Bibliography 
 Gianni Cancellieri; Cesare De Agostini, Powder and glory. The Gold Cup of the Dolomites (1947–1956), Giorgio Nada Editore, 2000. .
 Carlo Dolcini, The last golden cup of the Dolomites, Patron Editore, 2007.

External links
 Official Site
 ACI / CSAI (Automobile Club of Italy / Italian Motor Sport Commission); ACI presented the Gold Cup of the Dolomites 2013]
 Circuits of the World

Auto races in Italy